The 1996 Georgia Southern Eagles football team represented Georgia Southern University as a member of the Southern Conference (SoCon) during the 1996 NCAA Division I-AA football season. Led by Frank Ellwood in his first and only season as head coach, the Eagles compiled an overall record of 4–7 with a conference mark of 2–6, tying for sixth place in the SoCon. Georgia Southern played their home games at Paulson Stadium in Statesboro, Georgia.

Schedule

References

Georgia Southern
Georgia Southern Eagles football seasons
Georgia Southern Eagles football